Gerald Alexander Held (born 19 October 1958) is a German actor. He is internationally best known for his historical depictions, as Walther Hewel in the 2004 film Der Untergang, Robert Mohr in the 2005 film Sophie Scholl - Die letzten Tage and as state prosecutor Siegfried Buback in the 2008 film Der Baader Meinhof Komplex.

Life 
During his school years, Held was a solo singer of the Regensburger Domspatzen, and played football for TSV 1860 München, winning five youth championships. He finished his acting training at the Otto Falckenberg School of the Performing Arts in Munich, and then joined the Munich Kammerspiele. Further engagements at the Staatsschauspiel Hannover, the Freien Volksbühne Berlin, the Theater Basel, and the Salzburg Festival followed.

In 1993, Held was cast by director Klaus Emmerich in Morlock in his first television film role. Since then he has appeared in numerous cinema and TV productions, including Steven Spielberg's Schindler's List, Marc Rothemund's Sophie Scholl – The Last Days, and Oliver Hirschbiegel's Downfall. In the Sat.1 series Der Bulle von Tölz with Ottfried Fischer, he played a Social Democratic Party of Germany Bundestag member, who mostly has to look after his opponents in the "Bavarian Unity Party".

In 2007, he starred alongside Iris Berben as the greedy villain Heinrich von Strahlberg in the two-part TV film Afrika, mon amour. In 2008, he played Alois Kugler, the opponent of Brandner Kaspar, in the film of the same name, directed by Joseph Vilsmaier. In 2009, he played the politically tactical abbot Kuno in the Margarethe von Trottas film Vision alongside Barbara Sukowa, Heino Ferch, and Hannah Herzsprung, and in the same year, he was seen in Sönke Wortmann's Pope Joan as the Frankish Emperor Lothar I. In 2010, he played the Attorney General Dr. Sasse alongside Ulrich Tukur in Dieter Wedel's two-part TV film . Since 2010, he has starred in the crime series Stralsund as the head commissioner Karl Hidde. Since 2014, he has played the lead role of head commissioner Ludwig Schaller in the crime series München Mord.

Held's father was actor José Held, who died in 1974. From December 2005, Held was married to German actress Patricia Gräfin Fugger von Babenhausen (1961–2014).

Selected filmography 

1993: Schindler's List – SS Bureaucrat
1993: Morlock (TV Series) – Dr. Hagenberg
1996:  – Kripomann
1997:  – Wempe 
1998: Der Fahnder (TV Series) – Mackenrath
2000: Anatomy – Polizist
2001: The Shoe of Manitou – Karl May (cameo)
2001: 100 Pro – Betrunkener
2001: Leo & Claire – Gauleiter
2002: Bibi Blocksberg – Dr. Buttkock
2003: Strange Gardens – Officier SS
2003: Raus ins Leben
2003–2009: Der Bulle von Tölz (TV Series) – Hans Meidenbauer
2004: Before the Fall – Friedrich's father
2004: Downfall – Walther Hewel
2005: Sophie Scholl – The Final Days – Robert Mohr
2005: Der Schatz der weißen Falken – Carsten
2006: Wholetrain – Officer Steinbauer
2006:  – Happy Krüger
2007: Afrika, mon amour (TV Mini-Series) – Heinrich von Strahlberg
2008: The Wave – Tim's Father
2008: The Baader Meinhof Complex – Siegfried Buback
2008:  – Kugler Alois
2009: Zwischen heute und morgen – Zimmerkellner
2009: Vision – Kuno
2009: Pope Joan – Lothar I
2010:  (TV Series) – Dr. Saase
2010: Augustine: The Decline of the Roman Empire (TV Movie) – Older Valerius
2010: Nanga Parbat – Dr. Franz Burda (cameo)
2010: Stralsund – Karl Hidde
2011: 4 Days in May – Colonel Wald
2013: The Girl with Nine Wigs – Dr. Friedrich Leonhard
2014: München Mord (TV series) – Ludwig Schaller
2015: Sanctuary – Hausvater Brockmann
2015: Tannbach (TV Series) – Franz Schober
2017: My Blind Date with Life – Fried

Awards 

 2014: Bavarian TV Awards as best actor in the category Series and Film Series for his role in München Mord (ZDF)

External links 

 
 Short Biography and Film Overview at Prisma-Online (in German)

References 

Living people
1958 births
German male stage actors
Male actors from Munich
German male film actors
German male television actors